The tawny-breasted parrotfinch (Erythrura hyperythra) is a common species of estrildid finch found in Indonesia, Malaysia and the Philippines. It has an estimated global extent of occurrence of 1,000,000 - 10,000,000 km2.

The tawny-breasted parrotfinch is found in subtropical and tropical montane moist forest. The IUCN has classified the species as being of least concern.

References

External links
Species factsheet - BirdLife International

tawny-breasted parrotfinch
Birds of Malesia
tawny-breasted parrotfinch
Taxa named by Ludwig Reichenbach